Eliseo Nicolás Branca (born 20 September 1957 in Hurlingham) is a former Argentine rugby union player. He played as a lock. After leaving his local club, his entire career has been with Club Atlético San Isidro CASI, where he was a player for 27 years, and then a coach.

Career
Hailing from Hurlingham, in the Buenos Aires province, Branca started his career in the local club  Curupaytí. He later moved to Club Atlético San Isidro in 1973, with the club, where which he became the captain, and won three URBA titles; the most recent of which, in 1985, was the last won by the club in 20 years.

Branca debuted for Argentina in 1976, at Montevideo against Uruguay, although they were more relevant, they were not recognised as full international, three end-of-the-year matches, being one against a Wales XV and two against an All Blacks XV on tour in South America.

He won the 1985 and 1987 South American Rugby Championships, then, Branca took part with his country at the 1987 Rugby World Cup, where he played all the 3 pool stage matches against Fiji, Italy and New Zealand; he also won the 1989 South American Rugby Championship and in 1990, he ended his international career at Buenos Aires, with a win against England.

In 2000 he also ended his club career, after 27 years in the team; he also won a Nacional de Clubes.

Moving to the coaching career, he led CASI to the conquest of the URBA tournament in 2005 at the end of a final won against the city rivals San Isidro; due to disagreements with the management, he left the main team at the start of 2006 to then resume in the next season.
Later, besides coaching the youth team, he is also consultant, since 2009, for the Municipal Rugby School for San Isidro municipality.

Notes

External links

1957 births
Living people
Sportspeople from Buenos Aires Province
Argentine rugby union players
Rugby union locks
Argentina international rugby union players
Br